Hayley Beresford (born 26 June 1978 in Kellerberin, Western Australia) is an Australian equestrian.

She competed at the Beijing 2008 Olympics in the individual and the team dressage events. Riding Relampago do Retiro, she finished in 19th place in the individual event, while the Australian team of Kristy Oatley, Heath Ryan and Beresford finished 7th in the team event.

References 

Living people
1978 births
Australian female equestrians
Australian dressage riders
Equestrians at the 2008 Summer Olympics
Olympic equestrians of Australia